(born 18 April 1989 in Kumamoto) is a Japanese footballer who plays as a midfielder currently playing for Vanraure Hachinohe.

Career
Akiyoshi was the captain of his school's soccer team at Luther Senior High School. He started his career with Albirex Niigata FC (Singapore) in 2008 after graduating from Luthur Senior High School and played for 2 seasons. He turned down the chance to train with the parent club Albirex Niigata in order to join Singapore Armed Forces FC in 2010. He played for the club in the 2010 AFC Champions League group stage.

In January 2012, Akiyoshi was reported to be on trial with Kazakhstan Premier League side FC Kaisar.

Slavia Sofia
On 18 February 2012, after a successful trial period, Akiyoshi signed a -year contract at Slavia Sofia, becoming the first ever Japanese to play in the Bulgarian A Professional Football Group. He made his league debut in a 2–1 win over Minyor Pernik on 11 March, coming on as a substitute for Yordan Yurukov. On 7 April, Akiyoshi scored his first competitive goal for Slavia, scoring the equaliser in a 2–1 away win over Kaliakra Kavarna.

Club statistics
Updated to 23 February 2018.

References

External links

 Profile at Fagiano Okayama
 

1989 births
Living people
Japanese footballers
Singapore Premier League players
First Professional Football League (Bulgaria) players
J1 League players
J2 League players
Japan Football League players
Albirex Niigata Singapore FC players
Warriors FC players
PFC Slavia Sofia players
NK Zvijezda Gradačac players
SK Sturm Graz players
Ventforet Kofu players
Fagiano Okayama players
ReinMeer Aomori players
Vanraure Hachinohe players
Japanese expatriate footballers
Expatriate footballers in Singapore
Japanese expatriate sportspeople in Singapore
Expatriate footballers in Bulgaria
Expatriate footballers in Bosnia and Herzegovina
Expatriate footballers in Austria
Association football midfielders